Vasantrao Naik became the chief minister of Maharashtra on 5 December 1963. He succeeded P. K. Sawant's interim government that had been sworn in after Marotrao Kannamwar's death. Naik's government served until 1967 legislative elections, after which Naik was sworn in for a second term.

List of ministers
The ministry consisted of 14 cabinet ministers.

Deputy ministers
The ministry also contained 10 deputy ministers:
 G. D. Patil
 N. N. Kailas
 Y. J. Mohite
 M. A. Vairale
 R. A. Patil
 H. G. Vartak
 B. J. Khatal
 Rafiq Zakaria
 K. P. Patil
 D. S. Jagtap

References

Indian National Congress
N
N
Cabinets established in 1963
Cabinets disestablished in 1967